Bosley is a civil parish in Cheshire East, England. It contains 28 buildings that are recorded in the National Heritage List for England as designated listed buildings. Of these, one is listed at Grade II*, the middle grade, and the others are at Grade II. The parish is almost entirely rural. The major structure passing through the parish is the Macclesfield Canal, and 18 of the listed buildings are associated with the canal, namely 11 of the 12 Bosley Locks (lock number 6 is in North Rode parish), four bridges, an aqueduct, a milestone, and a distance marker. Also in the parish is Bosley Reservoir, and there are two listed structures associated with this. The other listed buildings are farmhouses, two bridges over the River Dane, a public house, a school, a church, and a sundial.

Key

Buildings

See also
Listed buildings in Congleton
Listed buildings in Gawsworth
Listed buildings in Heaton, Staffordshire
Listed buildings in North Rode
Listed buildings in Rushton, Staffordshire
Listed buildings in Sutton
Listed buildings in Wincle

References
Citations

Sources

Listed buildings in the Borough of Cheshire East
Lists of listed buildings in Cheshire